A weather balloon, also known as sounding balloon, is a balloon (specifically a type of high-altitude balloon) that carries instruments aloft to send back information on atmospheric pressure, temperature, humidity and wind speed by means of a small, expendable measuring device called a radiosonde. To obtain wind data, they can be tracked by radar, radio direction finding, or navigation systems (such as the satellite-based Global Positioning System, GPS).  Balloons meant to stay at a constant altitude for long periods of time are known as transosondes.  Weather balloons that do not carry an instrument pack are used to determine upper-level winds and the height of cloud layers.  For such balloons, a theodolite or total station is used to track the balloon's azimuth and elevation, which are then converted to estimated wind speed and direction and/or cloud height, as applicable.

Weather balloons are launched around the world for observations used to diagnose current conditions as well as by human forecasters and computer models for weather forecasting. Between 900 and 1,300 locations around the globe do routine releases, two or four times daily.

History 
One of the first persons to use weather balloons was Léon Teisserenc de Bort, the French meteorologist.  Starting in 1896 he launched hundreds of weather balloons from his observatory in Trappes, France.  These experiments led to his discovery of the tropopause and stratosphere.  Transosondes, weather balloons with instrumentation meant to stay at a constant altitude for long periods of time to help diagnose radioactive debris from atomic fallout, were experimented with in 1958. The drone technology boom has led to the development of weather drones since the late 1990s. These may begin to replace balloons as a more specific means for carrying radiosondes.

Materials and equipment 
The balloon itself produces the lift, and is usually made of a highly flexible latex material, though Chloroprene may also be used. The unit that performs the actual measurements and radio transmissions hangs at the lower end of the string, and is called a radiosonde. Specialized radiosondes are used for measuring particular parameters, such as determining the ozone concentration.

The balloon is usually filled with hydrogen due to lower cost, though helium can also be used. The ascent rate can be controlled by the amount of gas with which the balloon is filled. In this instance the instrument package is usually lost, although a parachute may be used to help in allowing retrieval of the instrument. Above that altitude sounding rockets are used, and for even higher altitudes satellites are used.

Launch time, location, and uses 

Weather balloons are launched around the world for observations used to diagnose current conditions as well as by human forecasters and computer models for weather forecasting. Between 900 and 1,300 locations around the globe do routine releases, two or four times daily, usually at 0000 UTC and 1200 UTC. Some facilities will also do occasional supplementary special releases when meteorologists determine there is a need for additional data between the 12-hour routine launches in which time much can change in the atmosphere.  Military and civilian government meteorological agencies such as the National Weather Service in the US typically launch balloons, and by international agreements almost all the data are shared with all nations.

Specialized uses also exist, such as for aviation interests, pollution monitoring, photography or videography and research. Examples include pilot balloons (Pibal). Field research programs often use mobile launchers from land vehicles as well as ships and aircraft (usually dropsondes in this case). In recent years weather balloons have also been used for scattering human ashes at high-altitude.
The weather balloon was also used to create the fictional entity 'Rover' during production of the 1960s TV series The Prisoner in Portmeirion, Gwynedd, North Wales, UK in September 1966. This was retained in further scenes shot at MGM Borehamwood UK during 1966–67.

See also 
 Atmospheric sounding
 Ceiling balloon
 High-altitude balloon
 SCR-658 radar
 Skyhook balloon
 Timeline of hydrogen technologies
 High-altitude platform
 UFOs

References

External links 

 Atmospheric Soundings for Canada and the United States – University of Wyoming
 Balloon Lift With Lighter Than Air Gases  – University of Hawaii
 Examples of Launches of Instrumented Balloons in Storms – NSSL
 Federal Meteorological Handbook No. 3 – Rawinsonde and Pibal Observations
 Kites and Balloons – NOAA Photo Library
 NASA Balloon Program Office – Wallops Flight Facility, Virginia
 National Science Digital Library: Weather Balloons – Lesson plan for middle school
 Pilot Balloon Observation Theodolites – Martin Brenner, CSULB
 StratoCat – Historical recompilation project on the use of stratospheric balloons in the scientific research, the military field and the aerospace activity
 WMO spreadsheet of all Upper Air stations around the world (revised location September 2008)

Earth observation balloons
Atmospheric sounding
Meteorological instrumentation and equipment
Scientific observation
French inventions